Up & Away is the debut studio album by American rapper Kid Ink. It was released on June 12, 2012, by the independently incorporated record label Tha Alumni Music Group. The album was supported by the singles: "Time of Your Life" and "Lost in the Sauce".

Commercial performance 
The album debuted at number 20 on the Billboard 200, with first-week sales of 20,000 copies in the United States. As of October 18, 2012, the album has sold 45,000 copies in the United States.

Singles
• "Time of Your Life" was released as the album's lead single on February 7, 2012.

• "Lost in the Sauce" was released as the second single from the album on April 26, 2012, through iTunes digital download.

Track listing

Charts

Weekly charts

Year-end charts

References 

2012 debut albums
Kid Ink albums
Albums produced by Jahlil Beats
Albums produced by FKi (production team)